Magnolia High School can refer to any of the following educational institutions:

 Magnolia High School (Arkansas) in Magnolia, Arkansas
 Magnolia High School (California) in Anaheim, California
 Magnolia High School (Texas) in Magnolia, Texas
 Magnolia High School (West Virginia) in New Martinsville, West Virginia